Lauderhill, officially the City of Lauderhill, is a city in Broward County, Florida, United States. As of the 2020 census,the city's population was 74,482. It is a principal city of the Miami metropolitan area, which was home to an estimated 6,012,331 people in 2015.

Etymology

The development that eventually came to be known as Lauderhill was originally to be named "Sunnydale", but William Safire, a friend of the developer, Herbert Sadkin, convinced him to change his mind. Safire felt that "Sunnydale" sounded like a neighborhood in Brooklyn. Sadkin said there were no hills in the new town, to which Safire replied, "There are probably no dales in Lauderdale, either!"  From that discussion, the name "Lauderhill" was coined. The development eventually grew to become Lauderhill, the city.

History

Lauderhill was one of two developments (the other in New York) that began largely as off-the-shelf architectural designs which had been available to the public at Macy's department store. The homes, which had been designed by Andrew Geller, had originally been on display at the "Typical American Houses" at the American Exhibition in Moscow. Following a group of approximately 200 of the homes constructed in Montauk, New York in 1963 and 1964, the same developer, Herbert Sadkin of the New York-based All-State Properties reprised his success in New York, building a series of similar homes in Florida, calling the development Lauderhill.

In 2003, the New York Times described the Macy's homes:

The package deal included a 730- to 1,200-square-foot house on a 75-by-100-foot lot, as well as state-of-the art appliances, furniture, housewares and everything else a family would need for a weekend in the sun, including toothbrushes and toilet paper. The cost was roughly $13,000 to $17,000.

The Inverrary Country Club was built in 1970, and two years later, its East golf course became home to the new Jackie Gleason Inverrary Classic on the PGA Tour, which it hosted through 1983.  Gleason himself built his final home on the golf course.

Up until the late 1980s-early 1990s, Lauderhill was mostly a retirement community for Jews and a second home for snowbirds (especially in the Inverrary neighborhood). It is now home to mostly Jamaicans, West Indians, and African Americans, but it still has a sizeable white, Jewish, and Hispanic population in the Northwest section and in the Inverrary neighborhood, located north of Oakland Park Boulevard and east of University Drive).

Geography

Lauderhill is located at  (26.165679, –80.232589) in north-central Broward County.

The city borders the following municipalities:

On its north and northeast:
Tamarac, Florida
On its northeast:
Lauderdale Lakes, Florida
On its east:
Fort Lauderdale, Florida
On its south:
Plantation, Florida
On its southwest and west:
Sunrise, Florida

Demographics

2020 census

As of the 2020 United States census, there were 74,482 people, 24,628 households, and 15,282 families residing in the city.

2010 census

Lauderhill has a high foreign-born population, with a noticeable proportion from the West Indies. In 2000, 33.65% of Lauderhill's population was born outside of the United States (24.63% were born in the Caribbean, and 14.73% from Jamaica alone).  Other major West Indian populations were born in Haiti, Trinidad and Tobago, Grenada, Dominica, The Bahamas, Guyana, U.S. Virgin Islands, and other Caribbean nations.

, there were 29,519 households, with 15.9% being vacant. , 31.8% had children under the age of 18 living with them, 37.4% were married couples living together, 20.1% had a female householder with no husband present, and 37.4% were non-families. 31.0% of all households were made up of individuals, and 13.6% had someone living alone who was 65 years of age or older.  The average household size was 2.49 and the average family size was 3.12.

, in the city the population was spread out, with 26.6% under the age of 18, 8.7% from 18 to 24, 30.3% from 25 to 44, 18.3% from 45 to 64, and 16.1% who were 65 years of age or older.  The median age was 35 years. For every 100 females, there were 84.5 males.  For every 100 females age 18 and over, there were 78.0 males.

In 2000, the median income for a household in the city was $32,515, and the median income for a family was $36,723. Males had a median income of $29,756 versus $25,167 for females. The per capita income for the city was $17,243.  About 15.5% of families and 17.8% of the population were below the poverty line, including 25.0% of those under age 18 and 13.1% of those age 65 or over.

In 2000, English was the sole home language of 79.14% of the population.  Haitian Creole was spoken at home by 7.85% of residents, Spanish by 6.92%, French by 2.69%, Yiddish by 0.59%, and Hebrew by 0.45% of residents.

, Lauderhill had the highest percentage of residents of Jamaican ancestry in the United States, at 20.11% of the city's population, and the percentage of Haitian residents in the United States, at 12.9% of the city's population

Education

Broward County Public Schools operates public schools.

Elementary schools in the Lauderhill city limits include:
 Broward Estates
 Castle Hill
 Dr. Martin Luther King, Jr. Montessori
 Endeavour Primary Learning Center (K–3, with 4–5 students in zone to Royal Palm)
 Larkdale
 Lauderhill Paul Turner
 Royal Palm

Students in other sections of Lauderhill are zoned to the following elementary schools: Banyan (Sunrise), Discovery (Sunrise), Park Lakes (Lauderdale Lakes), Plantation (Sunrise), and Village (Sunrise).

Middle schools with attendance zones serving Lauderhill include:
 Lauderhill 6-12 School
 Parkway Middle School
 Lauderdale Lakes Middle School in Lauderdale Lakes
 Millennium 6-12 Collegiate Academy in Tamarac
 Westpine Middle School in Sunrise

High schools with attendance zones serving Lauderhill include:
 Boyd H. Anderson High School in Lauderdale Lakes
 Piper High School in Sunrise
 Dillard High School (for 9–12 only) in Fort Lauderdale

A section of Lauderhill has a choice between Anderson and Piper. Lauderhill 6–12's high school program has no zoning boundary per se, but people who live in the middle school boundary have priority for admission. While Millennium's high school has no boundary, previous Millennium Middle students have priority for admission.

Charter schools include Rise Academy and Rise Academy II.

Sports in Lauderhill

On November 9, 2007, in the Central Broward Regional Park, the Main Event cricket field, owned by Broward County, was opened.

On May 22, 2010, it became the first ground to host an international between two full members of the ICC (New Zealand and Sri Lanka) on U.S. soil  after the games' World governing body gave its certification. The West Indies cricket team, who are the nearest premier cricketing region, have played there the most times. 

The park features many other sports venues as well.

Notable people

 XXXTentacion, rapper
 Ski Mask the Slump God, rapper
 Jackie Gleason, comedic actor, star of The Honeymooners
 Van Winitsky, tennis player
 Autry Denson, Football player

Sister cities

 Chaguanas, Trinidad and Tobago.
 Suzano, São Paulo, Brazil.

References

External links

 

Cities in Broward County, Florida
Caribbean-American culture in Florida
Cities in Florida